The Football NSW 2018 season was the sixth season of football in New South Wales under the banner of the National Premier Leagues. The competition consisted of four divisions across the state of New South Wales. The Premiers of the NPL NSW Men's 1 qualified for the national finals, playing-off to decide the champion of the 2018 National Premier Leagues.

Competitions

2018 National Premier League NSW Men's 1

League table

Finals

2018 National Premier League NSW Men's 2

The 2018 National Premier League NSW Men's 2 was the sixth edition of the NPL NSW 2 as the second level domestic association football competition in New South Wales. 14 teams competed, playing each other twice for a total of 26 rounds, with the top team at the end of the year (based on the Club Championship) promoted to the NPL NSW Men's 1 competition.

League table

Finals

2018 National Premier League NSW Men's 3

League table

Finals

2018 NSW State League

League table

Finals

2018 National Premier Leagues NSW Women's 1

The 2018 National Premier Leagues NSW Women's 1 was the fifth edition of the NPL NSW Women's competition to be incorporated under the National Premier Leagues banner. The league increased from 10 to 12 teams, playing each other twice for a total of 22 rounds.

League table

2018 Waratah Cup

Football NSW soccer clubs competed in 2018 for the Waratah Cup. The tournament doubled as the NSW qualifier for the 2018 FFA Cup, with the top five clubs progressing to the Round of 32. A record 169 clubs entered the qualifying phase, with the clubs entering in a staggered format.

The Cup was won by APIA Leichhardt Tigers.

In addition to the three A-League clubs (Central Coast Mariners, Sydney FC and Western Sydney Wanderers), the five qualifiers (APIA Leichhardt Tigers, Bonnyrigg White Eagles, Hakoah Sydney City East, Marconi Stallions and Rockdale City Suns) competed in the final rounds of the 2018 FFA Cup.

Honours and awards 
The End of Year awards were held at Dolton House and presented on 14 September 2018 for National Premier Leagues NSW Men's and Women's and on 21 September 2018 for National Premier Leagues NSW Men's and Women's 2, as well as Men's 3 and State League competitions.

National Premier Leagues NSW 
 Club honours and awards

 Individual awards

National Premier Leagues NSW 2 
 Club honours and awards

 Individual awards

Other Leagues 

 Individual awards

References

2018 in Australian soccer